The Divine Word Academy of Dagupan (DWAD) is a private, Catholic, basic education institution run by the Philippine Northern Province of the Society of the Divine Word in Dagupan, Philippines. It was founded by the Divine Word Missionaries in 1957. It is one of the few schools in the Philippines that offer an education in Chinese culture in addition to the regular curricula required by the Department of Education (Philippines) and by private schools, in combination with the ideals of a Catholic education.

The academy is under the direction of the Divine Word Missionaries and was primarily established for the benefit of the Catholics of Chinese descent residing in Dagupan and the province of Pangasinan. The school equally welcomes all children regardless of race, color and religious creed.

Its school director is Rev. Fr. Reynaldo B. Jimenez, SVD.

History

School directors 
 Rev. Fr. Reynaldo B. Jimenez, SVD (2020–present)
 Rev. Fr. Edgar Calunod, SVD (2014–2020)
 Rev. Fr. Edsel R. Demillo, SVD (2009–2014)
 Rev. Fr. Crisogono Cancino, SVD (2005–2009)
 Rev. Fr. Ambrose Ponce, SVD (1996–2005)
 + Rev. Fr. Winston Cabahug, SVD (1992–1996)
 Rev. Fr. Jess Del Rosario, SVD (1987–1992)
 + Rev. Fr. Matthias Ning, SVD (1975–1987)
 + Rev. Fr. Henry Schmitz, SVD (1962–1975)
 + Rev. Fr. Hubert Lorbach, SVD (1958–1962)
 + Rev. Fr. Richard Hartwich, SVD (1957–1958)
 + Bishop Teodore Schu, SVD (1957)

School administrators 
 Rev. Fr. Pablo G. Garay Jr., SVD (Finance Officer) 
 Rev. Fr. Thomas Aquino N. Wele, SVD (Campus Minister)
 Ophelia Q. Vergonia (School Principal)

Facilities

See also
Divine Word College of Bangued – Bangued, Abra
Divine Word College of Calapan – Calapan, Oriental Mindoro
Divine Word College of Laoag – Gen. Segundo Ave., Laoag, Ilocos Norte
Divine Word College of Legazpi – Rizal Street, Legazpi, Albay
Divine Word College of San Jose – San Jose, Occidental Mindoro
Divine Word College of Urdaneta – Urdaneta, Pangasinan
Divine Word College of Vigan – Vigan, Ilocos Sur
Divine Word University (DWU) – Tacloban, Leyte; closed in 1995, re-opened as Liceo del Verbo Divino

References

External links
Official website
DWAD facilities

Schools in Dagupan
Educational institutions established in 1957
Catholic secondary schools in the Philippines
Chinese-language schools in the Philippines
Divine Word Missionaries Order
1957 establishments in the Philippines